John "Mac" Wellington McKelvey (1847–1944) was a shortstop for the Rochester Alert amateur baseball team for a number of years and played one year for the professional New Haven Elm Citys in 1875.

Baseball career
John McKelvey was born in 1847 in Rochester, New York and raised in the city.  He played on a number of amateur teams in Rochester.  In 1869, he joined the Rochester Alerts, an amateur baseball club.  The Alerts played a number of regional and national teams and McKelvey gained a reputation for excellent defense.

In 1875, McKelvey joined the New Haven Elm Citys where he played for the entire season batting .229 with 10 RBIs. The next year, he rejoined the Rochester amateur team where he played for the remainder of his amateur career.

Sources

1847 births
1944 deaths
Major League Baseball outfielders
New Haven Elm Citys players
19th-century baseball players
Baseball players from New York (state)
Sportspeople from Rochester, New York
Burials at Mount Hope Cemetery (Rochester)